Marc Bernaus Cano (born 2 February 1977) is an Andorran former footballer who played as a left back.

Club career
Born in Andorra la Vella, Bernaus was a FC Barcelona youth graduate. He could never appear for the first team in La Liga, playing four seasons in Segunda División and another in Segunda División B with the B side. During his spell with the Blaugrana, he suffered a serious anterior cruciate ligament injury to his right knee that hindered his professional career.

Bernaus made 286 overall appearances whilst competing in the second tier of Spanish football (275 in the league, 11 in the Copa del Rey), also representing CD Toledo, Terrassa FC, Gimnàstic de Tarragona, UD Las Palmas, Getafe CF, Elche CF, Polideportivo Ejido and Girona FC. His biggest achievement came in the 2003–04 season, when he helped Madrid's Getafe to its first top-flight promotion by playing 33 out of 42 matches; he also suffered, however, five relegations, two of those with Barcelona's reserves.

International career
After having appeared for Spain at youth level, Bernaus opted to represent Andorra, his homeland, as a senior. On 13 October 2004, he entered the minnow footballing nation's history books when he scored the game's only goal against Macedonia in the 2006 FIFA World Cup qualifiers for their first ever competitive win.

International goal
Scores and results list Andorra's goal tally first.

References

External links

1977 births
Living people
People from Andorra la Vella
Andorran footballers
Spanish footballers
Association football defenders
Segunda División players
Segunda División B players
Divisiones Regionales de Fútbol players
FC Barcelona Atlètic players
FC Barcelona C players
CD Toledo players
Terrassa FC footballers
Gimnàstic de Tarragona footballers
UD Las Palmas players
Getafe CF footballers
Elche CF players
Polideportivo Ejido footballers
Girona FC players
Spain youth international footballers
Andorra international footballers